Leutert is a surname. Notable people with the surname include:

 Ernst Leutert (1898–?), Swiss cyclist
 Michael Leutert (born 1974), German politician